Crouch Township is one of twelve townships in Hamilton County, Illinois, USA.  As of the 2010 census, its population was 374 and it contained 175 housing units.

As of the 2010 census, its population was 260 and it contained 119 housing units.

Geography

Cities, towns, villages
 Belle Prairie City

Unincorporated towns
 Aden at 
 Garrison at 
 Piopolis at 
(This list is based on USGS data and may include former settlements.)

Cemeteries
The township contains these three cemeteries: Crouch, Garrison and Rawls.

Major highways
  Illinois Route 242

Airports and landing strips
 Moulton Farms Airport

Demographics

School districts
 Hamilton County Community Unit School District 10
 Norris City-Omaha-Enfield Community Unit School District 3
 Wayne City Community Unit School District 100

Political districts
 Illinois's 19th congressional district
 State House District 108
 State Senate District 54

References
 United States Census Bureau 2008 TIGER/Line Shapefiles
 
 United States National Atlas

External links
 Hamilton County Historical Society
 City-Data.com
 Illinois State Archives
 Township Officials of Illinois

Townships in Hamilton County, Illinois
Mount Vernon, Illinois micropolitan area
Townships in Illinois
1885 establishments in Illinois